George Wheeler (December 14, 1914 – July 8, 1990) was an American gymnast. He competed in eight events at the 1936 Summer Olympics.

References

1914 births
1990 deaths
American male artistic gymnasts
Olympic gymnasts of the United States
Gymnasts at the 1936 Summer Olympics
Sportspeople from Pittsburgh